There are a number of bus rapid transit systems in the Americas, with some of their technical details listed below.
The tables below are incomplete.  Mouse-over column titles to see expansions of the abbreviations, or see the notes below.

1 Ded.: Dedicated Right-of-Way
2 Excl. hwy: Exclusive highway lanes
3 Excl. street: Exclusive on-street lanes
4 Excl. part: Part-time exclusive lanes
5 Bypass: No exclusive lanes but heavy intersection bypass lanes
6 Shoulder: Buses can use bus bypass shoulders in congestion
7 HOV: High-occupancy vehicle (carpool) lanes can be used
8 Ltd. stop: System includes limited stop/express routes (includes conventional bus lines)
9 Pre-pay: Payment is made before boarding

Canada

Guatemala

Mexico

United States

Alabama

California

Colorado

Connecticut

Florida

Illinois

Indiana

Massachusetts

Michigan

Minnesota

Missouri

Nevada

New Mexico

New York

Ohio

Oregon

Pennsylvania

Rhode Island

Texas

Virginia

Washington

Wisconsin

See also
 List of bus rapid transit systems

Notes

1 Ded.: Dedicated busway or tunnel
2 Excl. hwy: Exclusive highway lanes
3 Excl. street: Exclusive on-street lanes
4 Excl. part: Part-time exclusive lanes
5 Bypass: No exclusive lanes but heavy intersection bypass lanes
6 Shoulder: Buses can use hard shoulders in congestion
7 HOV: High-occupancy vehicle (carpool) lanes can be used (common)
8 Ltd. stop: System includes limited stop/express routes (includes conventional bus lines, common)
9 Pre-pay: Payment is made before boarding

External links
 Recapturing Global Leadership in Bus Rapid Transit - A Survey of Select U.S. Cities (available for download in pdf) Institute for Transportation & Development Policy (May 2011)

fr:Liste des bus à haut niveau de service